Myotis annatessae is a recently described species of bat in the family Vespertilionidae. It is endemic to Vietnam and Laos.

Taxonomy 
The species initial holotype was collected at the Song Con River in Vietnam.

Description 
The species resembles smaller specimens of Myotis muricola, but is differentiated by a cranial and external characteristics.

Distribution and habitat 
The species is endemic to Southeast Asia. It is only known to occur in only two localities in Vietnam (Ha Tinh province) and Laos (Khammouan province).

Conservation 
The bat is considered data-deficient because of the lack of samples and information about the species.

References 

Mouse-eared bats
Bats of Southeast Asia
Mammals described in 2013